Tabernaemontana catharinensis is a species of plant in the family Apocynaceae. It is found in southern South America.

References

External links

catharinensis
Flora of southern South America
Flora of Brazil
Flora of the Atlantic Forest
Plants described in 1844